Bebe Nanaki, alternative spelt as Bibi Nanaki, was the elder sister of Guru Nanak, the founder and first Guru of Sikhism. Nanaki is an important figure in Sikhism, and is known as the first Gursikh. She was the first to realize her brother's 'philosophical inclination', and is credited for inspiring his use of music as an instrument of devotion to God.

Early life 
Nanaki and her brother were the children of Mehta Kalu and Mata Tripta. Born in the city of Chahal, present-day Pakistan, she was named by her grandparents, who named her Nanaki after the word Nanakian, roughly meaning "the home of your maternal grandparents".

Bebe and Ji are added to her name as a sign of respect. Bebe is used to pay regard to an older woman and Ji given to anyone whom you want to show your respects regardless of age. Bebe Nanaki got married at an early age of 11. In those days it was customary to be married at such a young age.

Nanaki married Jai Ram, a Palta Khatri employed at a modikhana, a storehouse for revenues collected in non-cash form, in the service of the Delhi Sultanate's Lahore governor Daulat Khan. Jai Ram helped Nanak get a job at this modikhana in Sultanpur.

Brother and sister 

Bebe Nanaki had an immense adoration for her brother and was the first to recognize his "enlightened soul". She was 5 years older but played the role of a mother to him. She not only protected him from their father but she loved him unconditionally. Guru Nanak was sent to live with Nanaki when he was only 15 years old. To instill his independence, she searched for a wife for him. Bebe Nanaki along with her husband found a woman, Sulakhni Chona, for Nanak to marry. Since Bebe Nanaki had no children of her own she loved and helped raise her brother's children, Sri Chand and Lakhmi Chand.

Bebe Nanaki is known as being Guru Nanak’s first follower. She was eternally devoted to him and his cause. She is also known for inspiring Nanak in using music as an instrument of devotion to God. Knowing he had musical talent she bought him a Rebab to help him further his music.

Death 

Bebe Nanaki died in 1518. As one of her last wishes she willed her brother, Guru Nanak, to be by her side during her last days. Her last breaths were enlightened with the Japji Sahib which was recited to her. Three days after her death, her spouse, Jai Ram, also died. Their funeral rites were carried out by Guru Nanak.

References

Bibliography 

Nanaki, Bebe
Nanaki, Bebe
Nanaki, Bebe
Indian Sikhs
Family members of the Sikh gurus
15th-century Indian people
Indian women religious leaders
People from Kasur District
16th-century Indian people
16th-century Indian women
15th-century Indian women
Scholars from Punjab, India
Women educators from Punjab, India
Educators from Punjab, India
Women mystics